Gone, But Not Forgotten is a 2003 film directed by Michael D. Akers. The critically acclaimed film showed at more than 30 film festivals. It is among the films featured in Gary Kramer's book, Independent Queer Cinema: Reviews and Interviews. The cover of the book displays the poster for the film; the director, Michael Akers, and the star, Matthew Montgomery, are both interviewed in Chapter Five.

Synopsis
Mark (Matthew Montgomery) falls while rock climbing. Drew (Aaron Orr) a forest ranger saves him and watches over him at the hospital. Drew, seeing Mark suffering from amnesia, offers Mark to move in with him to try to help him out until he regains his memory. This propels the two men into a passionate affair. But things start to change as Mark's memory slowly returns.

Cast
Matthew Montgomery as Mark Reeves
Aaron Orr as Drew Parker
Ariadne Shaffer as Catherine Reeves
Joel Bryant as Paul Parker
Brenda Lasker as Nancy Parker
Bryna Weiss as Dr. Mary Williams
Holden Roark as Towey
Jenny Kim as Nurse
Daniel Lee as Intern in Hallway
Mark Fellows as Man in Wheelchair
Joanne Bevelaqua as Drew's Mother
Glenn Blakeslee as Drew's Father
Brooke Hamlin as Kathy Tannenbaum

Filming
This film was "shot in 18 days by a cast and crew of 12, for a budget that wouldn’t buy a car."  Filming in seven weeks in Pinecrest, California, near Yosemite National Park, the director, Akers, used his personal credit cards for financing.

Screenings
The film has been screened in more than 30 film festivals including Outfest, Austin, Chicago, Memphis, Philadelphia, Rochester, Seattle, Tampa and internationally in Barcelona, Brussels, Hamburg, Ibiza, Lisbon, Madrid, Manila, New Zealand and Sydney

References

External links
Gone, But Not Forgotten page on United Gay Network website

2003 films
American independent films
American LGBT-related films
Films directed by Michael Akers
2003 LGBT-related films
2000s English-language films
2000s American films